Wild Bull of the Pampas may refer to:

 Luis Ángel Firpo (1894–1960), an Argentine boxer
 Vince Karalius (1932–2008), an English rugby league footballer